The Guatemalan Chess Championship is the annual individual national chess championship of Guatemala.  Following are the official winners of the national competition from 1923 to date.

Champions

| valign="top" |
{| class="sortable wikitable"
! Year !! Women's Champion
|-
| 1925||Judith Quiñónez de García Granados
|-
| 1981||Silvia Carolina Mazariegos
|-
| 1982||Silvia Carolina Mazariegos
|-
| 1983||Silvia Carolina Mazariegos
|-
| 1984||Silvia Carolina Mazariegos
|-
| 1985||Silvia Carolina Mazariegos
|-
| 1986||Silvia Carolina Mazariegos
|-
| 1987||Silvia Carolina Mazariegos
|-
| 1988||Silvia Carolina Mazariegos
|-
| 1989||Silvia Carolina Mazariegos
|-
| 1990||Silvia Carolina Mazariegos
|-
| 1991||Silvia Carolina Mazariegos
|-
| 1992||Silvia Carolina Mazariegos
|-
| 1993||Silvia Carolina Mazariegos
|-
| 1994||Silvia Carolina Mazariegos
|-
| 1995||Ingrid Lorena Martínez Porras
|-
| 1996||Dina Lissette Castillo Melendez
|-
| 1997||Dina Lissette Castillo Melendez
|-
| 1998||Ingrid Lorena Martínez Porras
|-
| 1999||Ingrid Lorena Martínez Porras
|-
| 2000||Karla Vanessa Monterroso Ochoa
|-
| 2001||Silvia Carolina Mazariegos
|-
| 2002||Silvia Carolina Mazariegos
|-
| 2003||Ingrid Lorena Martínez Porras
|-
| 2004||Silvia Carolina Mazariegos
|-
| 2005||Ingrid Lorena Martínez Porras
|-
| 2006||Claudia Mencos
|-
| 2007||Claudia Mencos
|-
| 2008||Claudia Mencos
|-
| 2009–2010||Silvia Carolina Mazariegos
|-
| 2010–2011||Claudia Mencos
|-
| 2011–2012||Silvia Carolina Mazariegos
|-
| 2012||Claudia Mencos
|-
| 2013–2014||Silvia Sotomayor
|-
| 2014||Silvia Carolina Mazariegos
|-
| 2015–2016||Silvia Carolina Mazariegos
|}
|}

References

External links
 History of chess in Central America
 Champions of Guatemala
 History of chess in Guatemala 

Chess national championships
Women's chess national championships
Championship
Recurring sporting events established in 1923
1923 in chess
1923 establishments in Guatemala
Sports competitions in Guatemala
Women's sports competitions in Guatemala